James Innes may refer to:

 James Innes (author) (born 1975), British author
 James Innes (Canadian politician) (1833–1903), Canadian journalist and politician
 James Innes (British Army officer, died 1759) (1700–1759), British provincial officer
 James Innes (Virginia) (1754–1798), Virginia attorney general, politician and Continental Army officer
 James Innes-Ker, 5th Duke of Roxburghe (1736–1823)
 James Innes-Ker, 6th Duke of Roxburghe (1816–1879)
 James Innes-Ker, 7th Duke of Roxburghe (1839–1892)
 James Dickson Innes (1887–1914), British painter 
 James John McLeod Innes (1830–1907), British soldier
 James Rose Innes (1855–1942), Cape Colony politician and South African judge

See also
James Ennis (disambiguation)